Krzysztof Supowicz (born 13 February 1984 in Warsaw) is a Polish slalom canoeist who competed at the international level from 2000 to 2006.

At the 2004 Summer Olympics in Athens, he was eliminated in the qualifying round of the C1 event, finishing in 13th place.

References

1984 births
Canoeists at the 2004 Summer Olympics
Living people
Olympic canoeists of Poland
Polish male canoeists
Sportspeople from Warsaw